Bernard Longley  (born 5 April 1955) is an English prelate of the Roman Catholic Church. He was named the Archbishop of Birmingham on 1 October 2009, and installed on 8 December 2009.

Early life and ministry
Bernard Longley was born in Openshaw, Manchester, and was educated at St Vincent de Paul parish school, then at Xaverian College in Rusholme. He later studied at the Royal Northern College of Music and New College, Oxford. He then was in formation for the priesthood at St John's Seminary, Wonersh where he was ordained a priest for the Diocese of Arundel and Brighton on 12 December 1981. He then served as an assistant priest at St. Joseph's Church in Epsom and as a chaplain to psychiatric hospitals.

Longley became Surrey Chairman of Diocesan Commission for Christian Unity in 1991, and National Ecumenical Officer at the Catholic Bishops' Conference of England and Wales in 1996. From 1987 to 1996, he taught dogmatic theology at St. John's Seminary in Wonersh. In 1999, he was named Moderator of the Steering Committee of Churches Together in Britain and Ireland, as well as Assistant General Secretary of Catholic Bishops' Conference with responsibilities for Ecumenism and Interfaith Affairs.

Episcopal career

Auxiliary Bishop of Westminster
On 4 January 2003, Longley was appointed Auxiliary Bishop of Westminster and Titular Bishop of Zarna by Pope John Paul II. He commented that he was "greatly honoured" and "very much overwhelmed" by his appointment. He received his episcopal consecration on the following 24 January from Cardinal Cormac Murphy-O'Connor of Westminster (who had ordained Longley priest 22 years earlier), with Coadjutor Bishop Arthur Roche of Leeds and Bishop Kieran Conry of Arundel and Brighton (Cardinal Murphy-O'Connor's successor in that see) serving as co-consecrators.

In 2007, Longley played a prominent role in the integration of the independent Soho Masses Pastoral Council, a group that sponsors Masses for homosexual Catholics, into the Archdiocese. The Bishop helped to form an agreement that moved the group's liturgies from an Anglican parish to a Catholic church (the Church of Our Lady of the Assumption and St Gregory), as well as a statement on ministry to homosexual Catholics that, while following Catholic teaching on homosexuality, underscored that "the Church's pastoral outreach recognises that baptised persons with a homosexual inclination continue to look to the Church for a place where they might live in authentic human integrity and holiness of life." In a BBC interview, Longley said that "it's never been the practice of the Catholic Church, as it were, to 'means-test' people before admitting them to the celebration of the Eucharist. It would be a mistake to jump to conclusions or to generalise about anybody's particular lifestyle, or their state of grace."

Longley was the head of the Diocesan Pastoral Board and had oversight of Central and East London, i.e. the Deaneries of Camden, Hackney, Islington, Marylebone, Tower Hamlets, and Westminster. He is considered to be a conservative who is "friendly" to the traditional Latin Mass, but also a "born diplomat." His name was mentioned as a possible successor to Cardinal Murphy-O'Connor as Archbishop of Westminster and thus often considered to be the 'head' of the Church in England and Wales, but the position ultimately went to Archbishop Vincent Nichols.

Archbishop of Birmingham
On 1 October 2009, Pope Benedict XVI appointed Bishop Longley as the Archbishop of Birmingham. He succeeded Archbishop Vincent Nichols, who was translated from Birmingham to Westminster earlier in 2009. Archbishop Longley was installed at St Chad's Cathedral on 8 December 2009, the feast of the Immaculate Conception. Before the ceremony, Archbishop Longley spoke of how much he was looking forward to joining both the Catholic and wider Christian communities in the Midlands and contributing to their work. Archbishop Longley played a leading role in the plans for the beatification of Cardinal John Henry Newman and presented the petition for canonisation to Pope Benedict XVI, which took place in Cofton Park, Birmingham on 19 September 2010 during the papal visit to the United Kingdom in September 2010.

On 5 January 2011, Archbishop Longley was appointed among the first members of the newly created Pontifical Council for the Promotion of the New Evangelisation.

Archbishop Longley is also co-chair of ARCC and has previously served as moderator of the Steering Committee of Churches Together in Britain and Ireland, as well as assistant general secretary of Catholic Bishops' Conference of England and Wales with responsibilities for ecumenism and interfaith affairs.

On Tuesday, 18 September 2012, Pope Benedict XVI named Archbishop Longley to serve as one of the Synod Fathers for the October 2012 13th Ordinary General Assembly of the Synod of Bishops on the New Evangelization.

On Wednesday, 5 August 2020, it was reported that Archbishop Longley forbade the Birmingham Oratory from distributing Communion on the tongue in order to prevent the spread of SARS_CoV_2. This action was widely criticized as it is generally understood that the ability to receive Communion on the tongue is a right of the faithful which a bishop has no authority to abrogate.

References

External links

 

1955 births
Living people
Clergy from Manchester
Alumni of New College, Oxford
21st-century Roman Catholic archbishops in the United Kingdom
Members of the Pontifical Council for the Promotion of the New Evangelisation
English Roman Catholic archbishops